= Rönneholmsparken =

Park in Malmö, Sweden

Coordinates: 55.59557°N 12.97618°E

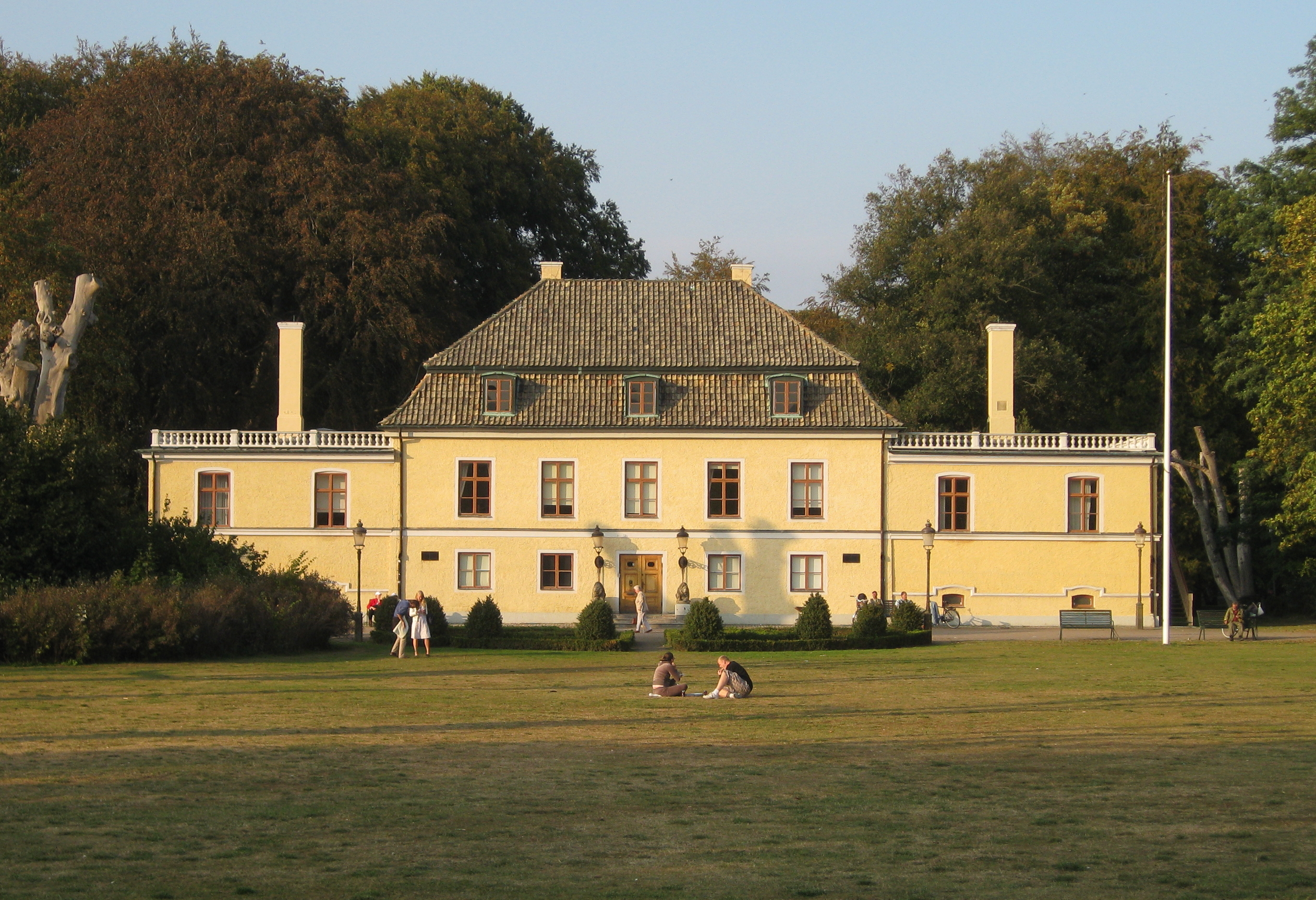
Rönneholmsgården

Rönneholmsparken (Rowanholm Park) is a park in Malmö, Sweden.
